Damian Troy Silvera (July 27, 1974 – June 14, 2010) was an American soccer player who was a member of the 1996 U.S. Olympic soccer team.  He also spent a season and a half in Major League Soccer.

Youth and college
Silvera grew up in Huntington, New York and attended Shenendehowa High School in Clifton Park, New York where he played on the boys soccer team.  In his junior and senior years, he was named as an All-American high school player. He won two NY state championships and a national championship while at Shenendehowa.  

After graduating from high school, Silvera attended the University of Virginia where he played as a midfielder on the men's soccer team from 1992-1995.  He was part of three NCAA championship teams as the Cavaliers took the title in 1992, 1993 and 1994.  In 1994, he was the NCAA tournament Offensive MVP and a second team All-American.  He graduated as Virginia’s all-time leader in assists.

National team
While in college, he was called up to the U.S. B-Team.  In the early 1990s, the United States Soccer Federation (USSF) signed players to national team contracts.  These players formed the A-Team.  Fringe or up and coming players were part of the B-Team, those members of the national team pool not under contract.  The B-Team also served as the core for the junior national teams.  In 1994, Silvera began playing with the B-Team.  This led to selection for the U.S. team at the 1995 Pan American Games.

Major League Soccer 
As Major League Soccer began preparations for its first season, it signed known players to contracts.  From this pool of players, the league allocated four to each team in order to ensure an initial equitable distribution of talent.  On February 5, 1996, MLS allocated Silvera to the MetroStars.  Eddie Firmani, coach of the MetroStars had requested Silvera based on his standout performances with the University of Virginia and the U.S. B-Teams.  Firmani saw Silvera growing into the role of creative midfielder with the MetroStars.

During the middle of the 1996 season, Silvera left the MetroStars to join the U.S. team for the 1996 Summer Olympics.  The U.S. went a disappointing 1-1-1 and failed to make the second round.  Silvera then rejoined the MetroStars, where it was becoming apparent that he would not become a creative force on the team.  Silvera seemed to have difficulty adapting to the professional game and the burden of pre-season expectations wore on him.  By the end of the season, the MetroStars coaching staff had moved him to defensive midfielder, but he never adapted to this role either.

On February 3, 1997, the MetroStars traded Silvera to the Kansas City Wizards for Mike Sorber and the first round pick in the 1998 MLS College Draft.  However, he appeared in only three games, one as a starter and the Wizards released him. His time in MLS finished, he briefly joined the Richmond Kickers of the A-league before retiring from playing.  There were later rumors that he had issues with depression.

Coaching
In 2001-2002, Silvera coached Soccer Alley, a team in the Second Division of the Atlanta District Amateur Soccer League.

References

External links
 Story of Silvera at the MetroStars

1974 births
2010 deaths
People from Flushing, Queens
American people of Jamaican descent
Sportspeople from Queens, New York
Soccer players from New York City
African-American soccer players
American soccer players
University of Virginia alumni
Virginia Cavaliers men's soccer players
Major League Soccer players
New York Red Bulls players
Sporting Kansas City players
Olympic soccer players of the United States
Footballers at the 1996 Summer Olympics
Pan American Games competitors for the United States
Footballers at the 1995 Pan American Games
Major League Soccer All-Stars
United States men's under-23 international soccer players
Association football midfielders
NCAA Division I Men's Soccer Tournament Most Outstanding Player winners
People from Huntington, New York
Sportspeople from Suffolk County, New York